alpha-L-fucosyltransferase may refer to

 Glycoprotein 6-alpha-L-fucosyltransferase
 Galactoside 2-alpha-L-fucosyltransferase
 FUT2
 FUT1
 Glycoprotein 3-alpha-L-fucosyltransferase
 3-galactosyl-N-acetylglucosaminide 4-alpha-L-fucosyltransferase
 Fucosyltransferase 3
 4-galactosyl-N-acetylglucosaminide 3-alpha-L-fucosyltransferase
 Peptide-O-fucosyltransferase
 Fucosyltransferase
 FUT5
 FUT8
 FUT9
 FUT6
 FUT7
 Fucosyltransferase 4